is a 1955 Japanese drama film directed by Kon Ichikawa. It is based on the 1914 novel Kokoro by Natsume Sōseki.

Plot
Student Hioki befriends an elder man, Nobuchi, and his wife Shizu, who live a reclusive life in their Tokyo home. A shadow of the past hangs over the couple in the shape of a long deceased friend, Kaji, whose grave Nobuchi regularly visits. Nobuchi slowly opens up to Hioki, who sees in him his tutor and addresses him as "sensei", explaining his distrust in people with his relatives' past attempt to withhold him of his share of his parents' inheritance. Hioki travels back to his hometown in the countryside, where his father is in a critical condition. Nobuchi writes a long letter to Hioki, his "testament", in which he recounts his friendship to Kaji, which he ultimately betrayed over their mutual love for Shizu, resulting in Kaji's suicide. When Hioki receives the letter, he hurries to Nobuchi's home, only to learn that Nobuchi has taken his own life.

Cast
 Masayuki Mori – Nobuchi, called "sensei"
 Michiyo Aratama – Shizu, Nobuchi's wife
 Tatsuya Mihashi – Kaji
 Shōji Yasui – Hioki
 Tanie Kitabayashi – Hioki's mother
 Akiko Tamura – Widow
 Mutsuhiko Tsurumaru – Hioki's father
 Tsutomu Shimomoto – Hioki's elder brother
 Masami Shimojō – Broker
 Akira Hisamatsu – Travelling monk
 Tomoko Naraoka – Kume
 Zenji Yamada – Nobuchi's uncle
 Keiji Itami – Kaji's father
 Kiyoshi Kamoda – Doctor

References

External links
 

1955 drama films
1955 films
Films produced by Masayuki Takagi
Nikkatsu films
Japanese drama films
Japanese black-and-white films
Films based on Japanese novels
Films set in the Meiji period
Films set in Tokyo
1950s Japanese films